William of Poitiers (1020–1090) was a Norman priest and chronicler, chaplain to William the Conqueror.

William of Poitiers may also refer to:

William I (915–963), called Towhead, count from 935
William II (937–994), called Fierebras, count from 963 to 990
William III (969–1030), called the Great, count from 990
William IV (1004–1038), called the Fat, count from 1034
William V (1023–1058), called the Eagle, count from 1039
William VI (1025–1086), count from 1058
William VII (1071–1126), called the Troubadour, count from 1086
William VIII (1099–1137), called the Saint, count from 1126
William IX (1153–1156), count at his death
William X (1136–1164)

See also

 William (disambiguation)
 Poitiers
 Poitou